Wateringskant is a hamlet in the Dutch province of North Holland. It is a part of the municipality of Hollands Kroon, and lies about 10 km north of Heerhugowaard.

Wateringskant is not a statistical entity, and the postal authorities have placed it under Lutjewinkel. It has no place name signs, and consists of about 10 houses.

References

Populated places in North Holland
Hollands Kroon